Su Sara may refer to:
 Su Sara, Gilan
 Su Sara, Golestan